USS Bass (SSK-2/SS-551), a Barracuda-class submarine, was the second ship of the United States Navy to be named for the bass, an edible, spiny-finned fish. She was originally named USS K-2 (SSK-2).

Bass was laid down by Mare Island Naval Shipyard. She was launched on 2 May 1951 as K-2 sponsored by Mrs. John J. Crane, widow of Commander Crane, and commissioned on 16 November 1951.

When the boat was rigged for silent running, these arrays gave greatly improved convergence zone detection ranges against snorkeling submarines. The SSKs themselves were limited in their anti-submarine warfare (ASW) abilities by their low speed and their need to snorkel periodically to recharge their batteries, but the advances they pioneered in sonar technology were invaluable to the development of nuclear-powered submarines. The class was developed as mobilization prototypes should large numbers of Soviet submarines based on the Type XXI U-boat appear.

K-2 arrived at Pearl Harbor on 23 May 1952 to join Submarine Division 72. Since she was a new type of submarine, she engaged in special evaluation operations to determine her capabilities and limitations. In January 1953 she underwent restricted availability at Pearl Harbor Naval Shipyard for the installation of additional equipment. In June 1953 she resumed operations and engaged in developing tactics and coordinated operations with other fleet units.

In January 1955, K-2 returned to Mare Island Naval Shipyard for overhaul.  After this she cruised to Mazatlán, Mexico, before returning to Pearl Harbor. She was renamed Bass on 15 December 1955. Bass operated out of Pearl Harbor until June 1957. On 26 June 1957 she returned to the United States and operated along the West Coast until going out of commission in reserve 1 October 1957.  In 1958, the Soviet threat changed from conventional to nuclear-powered submarines, and the SSK force was withdrawn from the SSK role and redesignated. Her hull classification symbol was changed to SS-551 on 15 August 1959.

Fate
USS Bass was struck from the Naval Vessel Register in 1965, and was sold for scrap on 17 November 1966.

References 

 Photo gallery of USS Bass at NavSource.org
 

United States Barracuda-class submarines (1951)
Cold War submarines of the United States
Ships built in Vallejo, California
1951 ships